Shantubhai Chunibhai Patel (born 10 September 1924) is an Indian politician. He was elected to the Lok Sabha, lower house of the Parliament of India from Sabarkantha  in 1989 as a member of the Indian National Congress.

References

External links
 Official biographical sketch in Parliament of India website

1924 births
Possibly living people
India MPs 1980–1984
Lok Sabha members from Gujarat
Indian National Congress politicians
People from Sabarkantha district